Golden Dawn or The Golden Dawn may refer to:

Organizations
 Hermetic Order of the Golden Dawn, a nineteenth century magical order based in Britain
 The Hermetic Order of the Golden Dawn, Inc., a modern revival founded in 1977
 Open Source Order of the Golden Dawn, a modern revival founded in 2002 and disestablished in 2019
 Golden Dawn (Greece), a 21st-century Greek political party and criminal organisation

Music
 Golden Dawn (band), an Austrian black metal band
 The Golden Dawn (American band), a 1960s psychedelic band
 The Golden Dawn (Scottish band), an indie pop/rock band
 "Golden Dawn" (Goldenhorse song), a song by Goldenhorse
 Golden Dawn (operetta), a 1927 operetta by Oscar Hammerstein II and Otto Harbach
 "Golden Dawn", a 1985 song by The Legendary Pink Dots from Asylum (The Legendary Pink Dots album)
 "Golden Dawn", a 1988 song by Ministry from The Land of Rape and Honey
 "Golden Dawn", a 1992 instrumental by Yngwie Malmsteen from Fire and Ice
 "Golden Dawn", a 2001 song by Edguy from Mandrake

Films
 The Golden Dawn (film), a 1921 British crime film
 Golden Dawn (film), a 1930 musical film
 Golden Dawn Girls, a 2017 Norwegian documentary about far-right politics in Greece

Other uses
 The Golden Dawn, a book by Israel Regardie
 Golden Dawn Tarot, a tarot deck by Chic Cicero and Sandra Tabatha Cicero
 Golden Dawn Publications, a former name of the publisher Mandrake of Oxford